Maxwell Dixon (born March 4, 1966), known professionally as Grand Puba, is an American rapper and emcee, best known as one of the members of the group Brand Nubian from New Rochelle, New York.

Biography 
He made his debut as Grand Puba Maxwell with the group Masters of Ceremony in 1984. Its album Dynamite (1988) was hailed by critics, but because of lack of sales the group soon disbanded and Puba became the lead emcee of Brand Nubian. After their debut album One for All (1990) — covering areas from reggae-influenced hip hop music to new jack swing — Puba left the group after disputes and began a solo career. Around 1997 he rejoined the group, recording a few tracks for various soundtracks leading up to the full-length album Foundation in 1998. In 1992 Sean "Puffy" Combs tapped Grand Puba to collaborate with up & coming R&B singer Mary J Blige on her debut album "What's the 411" The title song in which Puba co-wrote was the first time Blige incorporated her own rap technique which proved to be very successful. This was a rap/r&b hit record that went to number one on the R&B charts in the early spring of 1993. In 1999, Grand Puba and Sadat X performed on the track "Once Again" on Handsome Boy Modeling School's concept album So... How's Your Girl? Following Brand Nubian's 2004 record Fire in the Hole, Grand Puba appeared on tracks with Beanie Sigel ("Bread and Butter," also featuring groupmate Sadat X), Missy Elliott ("My Struggles," featuring his onetime collaborator Mary J. Blige), and Ugly Duckling ("Something's Going Down Tonight").

In 2009, Grand Puba released his fourth solo album, Retroactive, featuring production from Q-Tip, Large Professor, Kid Capri as well as fellow Brand Nubians. Puba also appeared on the heavy posse cut "Fresh" together with Cormega, KRS-One, Big Daddy Kane, DJ Red Alert and Parrish Smith of EPMD.

On the song "Old School" by 2Pac, Grand Puba was sampled and used in the hook. The sample originates from Grand Puba's verse on the song "Dedication" by Brand Nubian.

Discography

Studio albums

Solo 
 Reel to Reel (1992)
 2000 (1995)
 Understand This (2001)
 Retroactive (2009)
 Black from the Future (2016)

with Brand Nubian 
 One for All  (1990)
 Foundation (1998)
 Fire in the Hole (2004)
 Time's Runnin' Out (2007)

References

External links 
Information about Grand Puba

1966 births
African-American male rappers
American rappers of Jamaican descent
Elektra Records artists
Five percenters
Living people
Musicians from New Rochelle, New York
Rappers from New York (state)
21st-century American rappers
21st-century American male musicians
21st-century African-American musicians
20th-century African-American people